The 1911 Victorian state election was held on 16 November 1911.

Retiring Members

Liberal 

 Charles Forrest (Polwarth)
 Robert Stanley (Lowan)

Legislative Assembly
Sitting members are shown in bold text. Successful candidates are highlighted in the relevant colour. Where there is possible confusion, an asterisk (*) is also used.

See also

 Members of the Victorian Legislative Assembly, 1908–1911
 Members of the Victorian Legislative Assembly, 1911–1914

References

Psephos - Adam Carr's Election Archive

Victoria
Candidates for Victorian state elections